Two ships in the United States Navy have been named USS Zeilin after Brigadier General Jacob Zeilin (1806–1880), the first general officer of the  United States Marine Corps, and the seventh Commandant of the Marine Corps (1864–1876).

  was a troop transport. Originally named SS Silver State, and later SS President Jackson, the ship was acquired by the Navy in 1940. She was renamed Zeilin and commissioned in 1942. She was decommissioned in 1946.

References 

United States Navy ship names